At Binsey, near Oxford is a watercolour by the British Victorian artist George Price Boyce, who was associated with the Pre-Raphaelite art movement.

This 1862 watercolour is a view in the village of Binsey close to the city of Oxford in Oxfordshire, England.

It is in the collection of the Higgins Art Gallery and Museum, Bedford.

References

English paintings
1862 paintings
Culture in Oxfordshire
Pre-Raphaelite paintings
Landscape paintings
Culture in Oxford
Paintings in the East of England
Watercolor paintings
England in art